David Elsenrath (born June 30, 1962) is a former American football coach.  He was the 20th head football coachat Adams State College—now known as Adams State University—in Alamosa, Colorado, serving for three seasons, from 1997 to 1999, and compiling a record of 9–22.

Elsenrath played college football at the University of Missouri–Rolla—now known as Missouri University of Science and Technology.  He earned a master's of education at Auburn University, where he began his coaching career in 1986 as a graduate assistant on Pat Dye's staff.

Head coaching record

References

1962 births
Living people
Adams State Grizzlies football coaches
Auburn Tigers football coaches
Eastern Kentucky Colonels football coaches
Louisville Cardinals football coaches
Missouri S&T Miners football players
Tusculum Pioneers football coaches
Valdosta State Blazers football coaches
Junior college football coaches in the United States
Auburn University alumni